The Hurting is a British television series first broadcast in 2017 on Dave. The show is narrated by Jake Yapp and broadcasts humorous home and viral videos.

The show is a British version of US show Fail Army with a new voiceover.

References

2017 British television series debuts
2010s British comedy television series
2020s British comedy television series
Dave (TV channel) original programming
Video clip television series
English-language television shows